B. N. Sharma is an Indian actor. He began his career in a Punjabi soap, Jeb Katre on Jalandhar Doordarshan and comedy serial Flop Show. He is known for his roles in such films as Mahaul Theek Hai, Jatt and Juliet and Carry On Jatta.

Personal life
B.N. Sharma(Badri Nath Sharma) is an actor in the Punjabi film industry. He was born in Ropar and raised in Delhi in a family originally from Gujranwala. Although his parents wished for him to pursue a career in engineering, he moved to Chandigarh in 1972 and served in the Punjab Police department while pursuing a career in acting after developing a love for theater. During his service as a constable he completed 40-45 movies. He has 3 sons (triplet) and a daughter.

Career
He began his acting career with a negative character in Jalandhar Doordarshan's Punjabi soap Jeb Katre (Pocket Pickers) in 1985. His first movie was Vaisakhi (1987), which was a hit. He acted as a recurring and different character in hit series Flop Show in 1989. He later collaborated with Jaspal Bhatti in other ventures like Ulta Pulta and Full Tension. He had a minor role in anti corruption comic film Mahaul Theek Hai (1999) followed by major roles in over 70 Punjabi films. His recent hits include Jatt and Juliet, the quasi-sequel Jatt and Juliet 2 and Carry on Jatta. Sharma won the Best Actor in a Comic Role award at the PTC Punjabi Film Awards.

He has been acclaimed by directors for the perfection he puts in his work."I was so fascinated by acting that I wanted to become a part of it at any cost," Sharma told Punjabi Mania. "I remember when I was a kid (even before I started going school), I used to buy a flute from a balloon seller and play it. Now I realize that it was an art. As my father was quite rigid I had to take the extreme step and now with the hard work and love of all I am doing well."During an interview with Punjabi Mania, Sharma also stated: "I just think that the Punjab government must do something fruitful for Punjabi cinema too like they are doing in promotion of sports which is a good thing too. Punjabi cinema is doing wonders now and our government must contribute something to make it internationally renowned."

Selected filmography

References

External links

1965 births
Living people
21st-century Indian male actors
20th-century Indian male actors
Male actors from Punjab, India
Male actors in Punjabi cinema
Male actors from Delhi
Punjabi people
Punjabi Hindus
Punjabi Brahmins